Uvariopsis vanderystii is a species of plant in the Annonaceae family. It is found in Cameroon, the Democratic Republic of the Congo, and Gabon. Its natural habitat is subtropical or tropical moist lowland forests.  It is threatened by habitat loss.

Description
U. vanderystii is a monoecious shrub, with strictly cauliflorous inflorescences. Its petals are joined at the base, with flowers having distinct pedicels.

Taxonomy
U. vanderystii was first described by Robyns & Ghesq. in 1933.

References

Annonaceae
Flora of Cameroon
Flora of the Democratic Republic of the Congo
Flora of Gabon
Taxonomy articles created by Polbot
Taxa named by Jean Hector Paul Auguste Ghesquière